Ira Jackson McArthur (born May 30, 1902, date of death unknown) was a professional American football player in the National Football League (NFL). He made his NFL debut in 1926 with the Los Angeles Buccaneers. Over the course of his six-year career, Jack played for the Chicago Bears, Providence Steam Roller, Buffalo Bisons, New York Yankees, Los Angeles Buccaneers, Frankford Yellow Jackets, Newark Tornadoes, Brooklyn Dodgers and the Orange Tornadoes.

Upon retiring from football, he embarked on a professional wrestling career, with matches as early as 1934 and as late as 1960. Opponents included Bruno Sammartino.

His date of death is unknown.

References

1902 births
Year of death missing
American football centers
Brooklyn Dodgers (NFL) players
Buffalo Bisons (NFL) players
Frankford Yellow Jackets players
Los Angeles Buccaneers players
New York Yankees (NFL) players
Newark Tornadoes players
Orange Tornadoes players
People from San Joaquin County, California
Providence Steam Roller players
Saint Mary's Gaels football players
Players of American football from California